Since the first Giro d'Italia in 1909, there have been 1,983 stages, up to and including stage 21 of the 2022 Giro. Since 1931, the race leader following each stage has been awarded the pink jersey.

Although the leader of the classification after each stage gets a pink jersey, he is not considered the winner of the pink jersey, only the wearer. Only after the final stage is complete, the wearer of the pink jersey is considered the winner of the pink jersey, and thereby the winner of the Giro d'Italia. In 2020, British rider Tao Geoghegan Hart became the first cyclist to win the overall pink jersey, having never worn it during the race itself.

In this article first-place-classifications before 1931 are also counted as if a pink jersey was awarded. Although the number of stages is 1,983, this does not mean that also 1,983 pink jerseys were awarded. In the 1912 Giro d'Italia, the race was contested by teams, so no individual cyclist got a jersey. Sometimes more cyclists were leading the classification (1925 after stages 2 and 3, 1929 after stage 2, 1936 after stage 6, 1938 after stages 2 and 3, 1957 after stage 18 and 1973 after the prologue). As a result of this, there have been more pink jerseys given than there were stages. As of 2022, 2,005 pink jerseys have been awarded in the Giro d'Italia to 281 different riders.

Individual records
Key:

In previous Giri d'Italia, sometimes a stage was split in two. On such occasions, only the cyclist leading at the end of the day is counted. The "Maglia Rosa" column gives the number of days that the cyclist wore the pink jersey, the "Giro wins" column gives the number of days that the cyclist won the pink jersey. The next four columns indicate the number of times the rider won the points classification, the King of the Mountains classification, and the young rider competition, and the years in which the pink jersey was worn, with bold years indicating an overall Giro win. For example: Eddy Merckx has spent 78 stages as leader of the race, won the general classification five times; won the points classification two times, won the mountains classification one time, and never won the young rider classification. He wore the pink jersey in the 1968, 1970, 1972, 1973, and 1974 editions of the race (which he all won) as well as 1969 (which he did not win).

After Alberto Contador was stripped from his victory in the 2011 Giro d'Italia, Michele Scarponi became the new winner.

 Ranked by most days in the Maglia Rosa, updated until after Stage 21 of the 2022 Giro d'Italia.

Per country
The pink jersey has been awarded to 28 different countries since 1903. In the table below, "Jerseys" indicates the number of pink jerseys that were given to cyclists of each country. "Giro wins" stands for the number of Giro wins by cyclists of that country, "Points" for the number of times the points classification was won by a cyclist of that country, "KoM" for the number of times the mountains classification was won by a cyclist of that country, and "White" for the number of times the young rider classification was won by a cyclist of that country.
The "Most recent" column shows the cyclist of the country that lead the general classification most recently. The "Different holders" column gives the number of different cyclists of the country that lead the general classification.

Updated until after Stage 21 of the 2022 Giro d'Italia

Stage wins

Stage wins per rider

some 34 riders have won more than 10 stages at the Giro.

active riders are in bold

See also
Yellow jersey statistics (for a similar list of leaders in the Tour de France)
Vuelta a España statistics (for a similar list of leaders in the Vuelta a España)

External links
Giro GC and Stage Winners
Recent Giro results

Notes

Giro d'Italia
Cycling records and statistics